Sulby is a place name that may refer to:

Sulby, Isle of Man
River Sulby, two rivers
Sulby Glen
Sulby Reservoir
Sulby, Northamptonshire
Sulby Reservoir, Northamptonshire

See also
Soulby (disambiguation)